Trinchesia foliata is a species of sea slug, an aeolid nudibranch, a marine gastropod mollusk in the family Trinchesiidae.

Distribution
This species was described from Orkney, Scotland. It has been reported from the NE Atlantic, from the Faeroes and Norway south to Portugal, and in the Mediterranean Sea.

Description 
The typical adult size of this species is 8–11 mm.

Habitat 
Trinchesia foliata feeds on hydroids. It has been reported from a number of hydroids including Dynamena pumila, Sertularella gayi, Sertularella polyzonias and Abietinaria abietina family Sertulariidae.

References 

Trinchesiidae
Gastropods described in 1839
Taxa named by Edward Forbes